Chang Hsin-tien (born 11 April 1996) is a Taiwanese badminton player.

Career 
She plays mixed doubles with Chang Ko-chi. Together they were the runner up at the 2015 Chinese Taipei Masters Grand Prix losing there to the Indonesian pair Ronald Alexander and Melati Daeva Oktavianti in the finals.

Achievements

BWF Grand Prix 
The BWF Grand Prix had two levels, the Grand Prix and Grand Prix Gold. It was a series of badminton tournaments sanctioned by the Badminton World Federation (BWF) and played between 2007 and 2017.

Mixed doubles

  BWF Grand Prix Gold tournament
  BWF Grand Prix tournament

BWF International Challenge/Series 
Women's doubles

Mixed doubles

  BWF International Challenge tournament
  BWF International Series tournament
  BWF Future Series tournament

References

External links 

 

1996 births
Living people
Sportspeople from Taipei
Taiwanese female badminton players
21st-century Taiwanese women